Kenneth Cornelius Thomas (born July 25, 1977) is an American retired professional basketball player who played eleven seasons in the National Basketball Association (NBA).

High school career
He attended Austin High School, in El Paso, Texas, for three seasons before moving to Albuquerque, New Mexico to play for Albuquerque High School during his senior season. Averaging 25.2 points and 16.9 rebounds each game, Thomas helped Albuquerque to a 22–3 record and Class 4A state title. Parade named him a boys' basketball All-American in 1995.

College career
Thomas attended the University of New Mexico in Albuquerque, one of the highest-profile recruits to ever attend the school. He is second on the Lobos' all-time scoring list (1,931 points), career blocks list (239), and career dunks list (114), and leads the school's lists in career rebounds (1,032), freshman scoring (484) and rebounding (256), and personal fouls for a season (118) and career (383). Thomas is one of eight Lobos to be selected as an All-American (1998). Kenny led the Lobos to four consecutive NCAA Tournament first round wins. UNM was an amazing 71–3 in The PIT in Kenny's four years with the Lobos including 41 consecutive wins.

NBA career
The Houston Rockets selected Thomas as the 22nd pick in the 1999 NBA Draft. He led his team in rebounds for the 1999–2000 season, making him one of only two rookies to do so. Thomas was consistently among the team leaders in rebounds and blocked shots before being traded to the Philadelphia 76ers during the 2002–03 season. He was then named, The "K9".

Thomas was one of only eleven players to average a double-double for the 2003–04 season, and the shortest one at 6-foot, 7-inches.

On February 23, 2005, Thomas was traded to the Sacramento Kings in a deal that sent Chris Webber to Philadelphia. On February 18, 2010, the Kings released Thomas after the trade deadline.

Thomas was invited to the Memphis Grizzlies 2010 pre-season camp, but was waived on October 11.

After basketball

Personal life

After basketball Kenny became an entrepreneur and established multiple businesses where he has been under the mentorship of basketball great, Earvin “Magic” Johnson. Currently, Kenny is the president and CEO of T3 Productions LLC, a versatile multi-faceted company that engages in various business ventures including, but not limited to television and film production, sports entertainment and management, real estate development, and the PPE industry. Given his tenure in the basketball industry from high school to college and 11 years in the NBA, Kenny is also a strong proponent in the push for name, image, and likeness availability and opportunities for college and pro athletes. As a University of New Mexico alum (“UNM”), Kenny enjoys rooting on their sports teams and is still recognized as one of the most celebrated athletes to ever play at UNM. He is an avid golfer and plays in many charitable and private tournaments throughout each year. Kenny has two children and currently resides in Sacramento, California.

Basketball tournaments and camps

Kenny hosts multiple basketball tournaments and camps throughout the year in both New Mexico and California. He is also a member of the AAU basketball circuit.

Charitable work

Kenny is the founder of the Kenny Thomas Foundation dedicated to helping the community youth experiencing financial hardship by providing them with opportunities through higher education, college scholarships, and helping families in need of assistance move from poverty to self-sufficiency. He is also a member of several nonprofit boards including the ALS New Mexico Chapter board, the African American Greater Albuquerque Chamber of Commerce, and The University of New Mexico Black Alumni Chapter.

NBA career statistics

Regular season

|-
| align="left" | 1999–00
| align="left" | Houston
| 72 || 29 || 25.0 || .399 || .262 || .660 || 6.1 || 1.6 || .8 || .3 || 8.3
|-
| align="left" | 2000–01
| align="left" | Houston
| 74 || 21 || 24.6 || .443 || .272 || .722 || 5.6 || 1.0 || .5 || .6 || 7.1
|-
| align="left" | 2001–02
| align="left" | Houston
| 72 || 71 || 34.5 || .478 || .000 || .664 || 7.2 || 1.9 || 1.2 || .9 || 14.1
|-
| align="left" | 2002–03
| align="left" | Houston
| 20 || 14 || 29.3 || .432 || .000 || .733 || 6.9 || 2.0 || .8 || .3 || 9.9
|-
| align="left" | 2002–03
| align="left" | Philadelphia
| 46 || 28 || 30.3 || .482 || .000 || .750 || 8.5 || 1.6 || 1.0 || .5 || 10.2
|-
| align="left" | 2003–04
| align="left" | Philadelphia
| 74 || 72 || 36.5 || .469 || .200 || .752 || 10.1 || 1.5 || 1.1 || .4 || 13.6
|-
| align="left" | 2004–05
| align="left" | Philadelphia
| 47 || 43 || 28.6 || .456 || .250 || .798 || 6.6 || 1.6 || .9 || .1 || 11.3
|-
| align="left" | 2004–05
| align="left" | Sacramento
| 26 || 15 || 31.7 || .492 || .000 || .722 || 8.7 || 2.9 || 1.0 || .4 || 14.5
|-
| align="left" | 2005–06
| align="left" | Sacramento
| 82 || 55 || 28.0 || .505 || .000 || .676 || 7.5 || 2.0 || .9 || .5 || 9.1
|-
| align="left" | 2006–07
| align="left" | Sacramento
| 62 || 53 || 22.8 || .482 || .000 || .513 || 6.1 || 1.2 || .7 || .3 || 5.3
|-
| align="left" | 2007–08
| align="left" | Sacramento
| 23 || 3 || 12.2 || .421 || .000 || .000 || 2.7 || .6 || .3 || .0 || 1.4
|-
| align="left" | 2008–09
| align="left" | Sacramento
| 8 || 0 || 7.8 || .375 || .000 || .000 || 1.9 || .1 || .8 || .1 || .8
|-
| align="left" | 2009-10
| align="left" | Sacramento
| 26 || 2 || 12.0 || .486 || .000 || .583 || 3.3 || .6 || .4 || .4 || 1.6
|- class="sortbottom"
| style="text-align:center;" colspan="2"| Career
| 632 || 406 || 27.4 || .465 || .244 || .699 || 6.9 || 1.5 || .8 || .4 || 9.3

Playoffs

|-
| align="left" | 2003
| align="left" | Philadelphia
| 12 || 12 || 32.4 || .535 || .000 || .655 || 9.3 || .9 || .7 || .4 || 10.6
|-
| align="left" | 2005
| align="left" | Sacramento
| 5 || 5 || 30.6 || .511 || .000 || .700 || 8.8 || 2.4 || .8 || .4 || 12.0
|-
| align="left" | 2006
| align="left" | Sacramento
| 6 || 6 || 24.7 || .542 || .000 || .692 || 4.5 || 1.3 || .8 || .0 || 5.8
|- class="sortbottom"
| style="text-align:center;" colspan="2"| Career
| 23 || 23 || 30.0 || .529 || .000 || .677 || 8.0 || 1.3 || .7 || .3 || 9.7

References

External links
 

 New Mexico Lobos bio (archived)

1977 births
Living people
African-American basketball players
All-American college men's basketball players
American men's basketball players
Basketball players from Atlanta
Basketball players from Albuquerque, New Mexico
Basketball players from El Paso, Texas
Houston Rockets draft picks
Houston Rockets players
New Mexico Lobos men's basketball players
Parade High School All-Americans (boys' basketball)
Philadelphia 76ers players
Power forwards (basketball)
Sacramento Kings players
Universiade medalists in basketball
Universiade gold medalists for the United States
Medalists at the 1997 Summer Universiade
21st-century African-American sportspeople
20th-century African-American sportspeople